Registrar of Copyrights is a designation in many countries of the world, who heads the Copyright office and looks after registration of copyrights in the relevant jurisdiction.

Registrar of Copyrights may refer to:

 Register of Copyrights (United States of America)
 Registrar of Copyrights (India)